The 4th People's Choice Awards, honoring the best in popular culture for 1977, were held in 1978. They were broadcast on CBS.

Winners

Favorite Female Performer in a New TV Program:
Suzanne Somers

Favorite Motion Picture:
Star Wars

Favorite Motion Picture Actor:
John Wayne

Favorite All-Around Male Entertainer:
Bob Hope

Favorite New Song:
"Boogie Nights",
"You Light Up My Life"

Favorite New TV Comedy Program:
Three's Company,
The Love Boat

Favorite All-Around Female Entertainer:
Carol Burnett

Favorite New TV Dramatic Program:
Eight Is Enough

Favorite Motion Picture Actress:
Barbra Streisand

Favorite TV Comedy Program:
M*A*S*H

Favorite Male Musical Performer:
Peter Frampton

Favorite Male Performer in a New TV Program:
Dan Haggerty

Favorite Overall New TV Program:
Eight Is Enough

Favorite TV Variety Program:
The Carol Burnett Show

Favorite Male TV Performer:
James Garner

Favorite TV Dramatic Program:
Little House on the Prairie

Favorite Female TV Performer:
Mary Tyler Moore

References

People's Choice Awards
1977 awards
1978 in American television
1977 awards in the United States
February 1978 events in the United States